Maurice Garland Fulton (December 3, 1877 – 1955) was an American historian and English professor. He was a professor of English and History at the New Mexico Military Institute for three decades. He was the (co-)author or (co-)editor of several books, and "an authority on the Lincoln County War and Southwestern history."

Early life
Maurice Garland Fulton was born on December 3, 1877, in Lafayette County, Mississippi. His father, Robert Burwell Fulton, served as the seventh chancellor of the University of Mississippi in Oxford, Mississippi. His maternal grandfather, Landon Garland, was a slaveholder who served as the second president of Randolph-Macon College in Ashland, Virginia, from 1836 to 1846, the third president of the University of Alabama in Tuscaloosa, Alabama, from 1855 to 1865, and the first chancellor of Vanderbilt University in Nashville, Tennessee, from 1875 to 1893. Fulton had three brothers and a sister.

Fulton graduated from the University of Mississippi, where he earned a Ph.B. in English in 1898, followed by an A.M. in 1901. He attended graduate school at the University of Michigan, but came short of earning a PhD.

Career
Fulton taught at his alma mater, the University of Mississippi, from 1900 to 1901, followed by the University of Michigan until 1903, the University of Illinois in 1904, and back at the University of a year. He later taught at Centre College from 1905 to 1909, followed by Davidson College until 1918. He took a hiatus to serve as a colonel in the United States Army during World War I in 1918, and returned to academia, teaching at Indiana University from 1919 to 1922. He was a professor of English and History at New Mexico Military Institute in Roswell, New Mexico, from 1922 to 1955. Fulton taught the courses about William Shakespeare and Charles Lamb as well as Mississippi poet Irwin Russell. He was the chair of the English department at NMMI.

Fulton (co-)authored or (co-)edited several books, and he became "an authority on the Lincoln County War and Southwestern history." He edited the writings of Theodore Roosevelt, who served as the 26th president of the United States from 1901 to 1909, and Pat Garrett's biography of Billy the Kid. He edited a history of New Mexico and two volumes of Josiah Gregg's diary and letters with Paul Horgan. He was active in the Chaves County Historical Society.

Personal life and death
Fulton married Vaye McPhearson Callahan. He died on February 12, 1955, in Roswell, New Mexico, at 77. He was buried in South Park Cemetery, Roswell, NM. His papers are at the University of Arizona.

Selected works

References

External links
Maurice Garland Fulton at Find a Grave

 Worldcat Overview & works, Maurice G. Fulton

1877 births
1955 deaths
People from Oxford, Mississippi
People from Roswell, New Mexico
University of Mississippi alumni
University of Mississippi faculty
University of Michigan faculty
Centre College faculty
Davidson College faculty
Indiana University faculty
United States Army personnel of World War I
United States Army colonels
American academics of English literature
Historians of the American West
20th-century American historians
American male non-fiction writers
20th-century American male writers